José Luis Bueno (born 8 December 1969) is a Mexican former professional boxer and former WBC and Lineal Super Flyweight Champion. Bueno was also the trainer of former WBC Light Flyweight Champion, Adrián Hernández.

Professional career
In June 1987, José began his professional career losing to fellow debutant Miguel Banda. In 1991 he beat title contender Armando Salazar to win the WBC Continental Americas Super Flyweight title.

WBC Super Flyweight Championship
On November 13, 1993 Bueno upset Sung-Kil Moon to win the WBC and Lineal Super Flyweight title. This bout was held in Indoor Gymnasium, Pohang City, South Korea. He lost the title in a controversial decision to Hiroshi Kawashima in Japan.

WBC Bantamweight Championship
José lost a split decision to Wayne McCullough in The Point, Dublin, Ireland.

WBC Super Bantamweight Championship
Bueno's last bout was against four division World Champion, Erik Morales. He retired after his defeat to Morales in 1998.

See also
List of super-flyweight boxing champions
List of Mexican boxing world champions

References

External links

José Luis Bueno - CBZ Profile

Boxers from the State of Mexico
People from Nezahualcóyotl
World Boxing Council champions
World super-flyweight boxing champions
Bantamweight boxers
1969 births
Living people
Mexican male boxers